Buddleja kleinii is a species endemic to a small area of cloud forest bordering the eastern portion of the Serra Geral of Santa Catarina and the Rio Grande do Sul in Brazil at altitudes of 1200 – 1650 m. The species was named by Norman & Smith in 1976.

Description
Buddleja kleinii is a dioecious shrub 1 – 2.5 m high with dark-brown fissured bark. The young branches are subquadrangular and tomentose, bearing narrowly elliptic leaves 5 – 10 cm long by 1.5 – 3.5 cm wide, mostly on 1.5 – 2 cm petioles but occasionally subsessile; the blade is glabrescent above and tomentose below. The white inflorescence is 6 – 9 cm long by 2 – 4 cm wide, comprising pairs of congested cymes 1.2 – 1.7 cm  in diameter, each with 10 – 15 flowers. The corolla is 6 – 6.5 mm long.

Cultivation
The shrub is not known to be in cultivation.

References

kleinii
Flora of Brazil
Flora of South America